Loughton was a local government district in south west Essex, England. It contained the town and Civil Parish of Loughton and was bordered by Buckhurst Hill Urban District, Chingford Urban District, Epping Rural District and Waltham Holy Cross Urban District.

Demographics 
In the 1931 census, out of those responding, social classes divided as following:
 21% Professional, managerial and Technical occupations
 53% Skilled Occupations
 25% Partly skilled and unskilled occupations
Also, in 1931, 4% of the district were unemployed; 3334 were employed, while 119 were unemployed.

External links and References 
 Loughton UD - part of 
 Vision of Britain.org

Political history of Essex
Loughton
Urban districts of England